Sarıköy may refer to:

Sarıköy, Balıkesir, a village in Balıkesir Province, Turkey, site of ancient Zeleia
Sarıköy, Başmakçı, a village in the District of Başmakçı, Afyonkarahisar Province, Turkey
Sarıköy, Bismil
Sarıköy, Çine, a village in the District of Çine, Aydın Province, Turkey
Sarıköy, Merzifon, a village in the District of Merzifon, Amasya Province, Turkey